Muzio Calini (died April 1570) was a Roman Catholic prelate who served as Archbishop (Personal Title) of Terni (1566–1570) and Archbishop of Zadar (1555–1566).

Biography
Muzio Calini was born in Brescia, Italy in 1525.
On 17 July 1555, he was appointed by Pope Paul IV as Archbishop of Zadar.
On 12 July 1566, he was appointed by Pope Pius V as Archbishop (Personal Title) of Terni. 
He served as Bishop of Terni until his death on In April 1570 in Terni, Italy.

See also
Catholic Church in Italy

References

External links and additional sources
 (for Chronology of Bishops) 
 (for Chronology of Bishops) 
 (for Chronology of Bishops) 
 (for Chronology of Bishops) 

16th-century Roman Catholic bishops in Croatia
1570 deaths
Bishops appointed by Pope Paul IV
Bishops appointed by Pope Pius V
1525 births